Smile -Live at Wolf Creek- is the second live album by Japanese experimental band Boris. It was released through Daymare Recordings on November 21, 2008, featuring guest musician Michio Kurihara of Ghost. It was recorded live in Wolf Creek, California, in May 2008.

The track listing follows the American version of Smile, with the tracks "Pink", "Statement" b-side "Floor Shaker", and "Rainbow" added. The artwork is nearly identical to the artwork for the Japanese release of Smile: it is in a plastic, fold-out sleeve with colored sponges sealed inside. The only significant change in the artwork is the color of the sleeve and sponges (dark grey instead of yellow).

Track listing

Personnel
 Takeshi – guitar, bass guitar, vocals
 Wata – guitar, vocals
 Atsuo – drums, percussion, vocals
 Michio Kurihara – guitar 

Boris (band) live albums
2008 live albums